Jurisprudence of values or jurisprudence of principles is a school of legal philosophy. This school represents, according to some authors, a step in overcoming the contradictions of legal positivism and, for this reason, it has been considered by some authors as a post-positivism school. Jurisprudence of values is referred to in various works all over the world.

This modus of thinking of focuses on constitutional principles.

The jurisprudence of values centers on the concepts of incidence and interpretation of the legal norm, as well as rules and principles, and concepts like equality, freedom, and justice.

Juridical norms 
According to Pontes de Miranda, "The juridical rule is the norm with which the man, willing to subordinate the events to an order and foreseeability, tries to distribute the life's goods". Mankind seeks to somehow control the facts; the juridical norm is used as a tool to decide what is right and wrong. The norm, according to this school, is seen as a creation of man, thus man is controlling man.

Pontes de Miranda explains the concept of fact support. Fact support is the fact that is previewed by the norm; it is the abstract fact; it is the fact that, if it is verified true in the world of facts the norm will fall upon it. In other words, there is a world of concrete facts and there is another world of ideas or types. Thus, the legislator tries to use words to group possible concrete facts into sets, related to the world of ideas. This paradigm makes possible to attribute judicial effects to life's facts.

See also 
 Hermeneutics
 Jurisprudence of concepts
 Jurisprudence of interests
 Philosophy of law
 Legal naturalism
 Legal positivism

Notes

References

Further reading 
 
 
 Barroso, Luís Roberto. Interpretação e aplicação da Constituição, 3 ed. São Paulo: Saraiva, 1999.
 Barroso, Luís Roberto. O Direito Constitucional e a Efetividade de Suas Normas: Limites e Possibilidades da Constituição Brasileira, 6 ed. Rio de Janeiro: Renovar, 2002.
 
 
 
 
 Pontes de Miranda, Fracisco Cavalcanti. Tratado de Direito Privado, V. I. Rio de Janeiro: Ed. Borsoi, 1954.

External links 
 The Reasonability Control  in Comparative Law
 The Modern Legal Philosophical Thinking: From the Exegesis to the Jurisprudence of Values
 Diritto.it
 Constitutional Interpretation: System and Problem
 Crisis in the Model of Justice: Proceeding Paradigm of the Normative Construction and the New Role of Lawyer Workers

Philosophy of law
Value (ethics)